Milkwhite Sheets is the fourth solo album released by former Belle & Sebastian member Isobel Campbell. The album was released on 23 October 2006. It brings traditional songs from United Kingdom and songs written by Campbell. She said the album was inspired by the works of Jean Ritchie, Anne Briggs and Shirley Collins.

Track listing
All songs written by Isobel Campbell, except where noted.

External links
 Official website Info on the album

2006 albums
Isobel Campbell albums
V2 Records albums